Sarab  is a promenade and forest park located in Fereydunshahr, Isfahan province. This park is most famous for its natural fountain and attracts many tourists. Its facilities include a skating rink, amusement park, sports equipment , supermarket and rental villas.

Area 
The area of this promenade reaches 42 hectares.

Gallery

References 

Amusement parks in Iran
Entertainment venues in Iran
Tourist attractions in Iran